The International Journal of Developmental Neuroscience is the official journal of the International Society for Developmental Neuroscience. It was published up to 2020 by Elsevier when it was transferred to Wiley. It publishes original work in developmental neuroscience.

External links 
 
 International Society for Developmental Neuroscience

Neuroscience journals
Elsevier academic journals
Publications established in 1983
English-language journals
8 times per year journals